Giovanni Battista Monti (died 1657) was an Italian painter of portraits during the Baroque period, active mainly in his natal city of Genoa. He emerged from a poor family, and was apprenticed with Luciano Borzone. He died from the plague in 1657.

References

Year of birth missing
1657 deaths
17th-century Italian painters
Italian male painters
Painters from Genoa
Italian Baroque painters
17th-century deaths from plague (disease)